Simon Grigorevich Gindikin (born 7 December 1937, Moscow, Russian SFSR) is a mathematician at Rutgers University who introduced the Gindikin–Karpelevich formula for the Harish-Chandra c-function.

Publications

References

External links
Interview with Simon Gindikin
Home page of Simon Gindikin

1937 births
Living people
Mathematicians from Moscow
Russian Jews